Hieronimo Custodis (also spelled Hieronymus, Heironimos) (died c. 1593) was a Flemish portrait painter active in England in the reign of Elizabeth I.

Life and work
A native of Antwerp, Custodis was one of many Flemish artists of the Tudor court who had fled to England to avoid the persecution of Protestants in the Spanish Netherlands. He is thought to have arrived in England sometime after the fall of Antwerp to the forces of the Duke of Parma in 1585.

Three English portraits by Custodis signed and dated 1589 firmly establish him as resident in London by that year.  Sir Roy Strong attributes a portrait of Sir Henry Bromley dated 1587 to Custodis, suggesting an earlier arrival, and has verified the recent attribution of a portrait of the young Edward Talbot dated 1586 to Custodis. In 1591, he was living in the parish of St Bodolph-without-Aldgate where "Jacobus the son of Ieronyme Custodis A Paynter" was baptised on 2 March. He is assumed to have died in 1593, as all of his known works are dated between 1589 and 1593, and his widow remarried that year.

Custodis's unsigned but dated works are identified by "palaeographical peculiarities" in the inscriptions which can be closely matched to those in his signed portraits.

Gallery

Notes

References
Hearn, Karen, ed. Dynasties: Painting in Tudor and Jacobean England 1530-1630.  New York: Rizzoli, 1995.  
Strong, Roy. The English Icon: Elizabethan and Jacobean Portraiture, 1969, Routledge & Kegan Paul, London (Strong 1969)
Strong, Roy. "Elizabethan Painting: An Approach Through Inscriptions. 1: Robert Peake the Elder." The Burlington Magazine 105 (February 1963): 53–57. Reprinted in Strong 1969.
Weiss Gallery. Facing the Past: A catalogue of early portraiture 1530–1780, Weiss Gallery, London.

External links
 

People of the Tudor period
English art
Renaissance painters
1593 deaths
Flemish Renaissance painters
Year of birth unknown
16th-century Flemish painters
Male painters